Google Me may refer to:
"Google Me" (Teyana Taylor song), 2007 song
"Google Me" (Kim Zolciak song), 2010 song
"Google Me!", poem by Saviana Stănescu
Google Me (film), American film